The Episcopal Diocese of Los Angeles is a community of 48,874 Episcopalians in 147 congregations, 40 schools, and 18 major institutions, spanning all of Los Angeles, Orange, San Bernardino, Santa Barbara, and Ventura counties, and part of Riverside County.

One of the U.S.-based Episcopal Church's 110 dioceses spanning 16 nations, the Diocese of Los Angeles was established in 1895 by vote of the General Convention of the national church. The diocese's first convention was held in 1896.

The diocese is led by its bishop, presently the Rt. Rev. John H. Taylor; its administrative hub is St. Paul’s Commons, located in the Echo Park district of Los Angeles. St. John's Cathedral is the cathedral of the diocese and the center for major diocesan liturgical functions.

The common ministry of the diocese is guided by its convention, held annually. 
Between annual meetings, the work of convention is overseen by the diocesan council, which meets usually the first or second Thursday of each month at St. Paul’s Commons.

Bishops of Los Angeles

Diocesan bishops 
 Joseph Horsfall Johnson (1895–1928)
 W. Bertrand Stevens (1928–1947, Coadjutor 1920–1928)
 Francis Eric Bloy (1948–1973)
 Robert Claflin Rusack (1974–1986, Coadjutor 1972–1974)
 Frederick Houk Borsch (1988–2002)
 J. Jon Bruno (2002–2017, Coadjutor 2000–2002)
 John Taylor (2017–present, Coadjutor 2016–2017)

Suffragan bishops 
 Robert B. Gooden (1930–1947)
 Donald J. Campbell (1949–1959)
 Ivol I. Curtis (1960–1964)
 Robert Claflin Rusack (1964–1973)
 Oliver B. Garver, Jr. (1985–1990)
 Chester L. Talton (1991–2010)
 Diane Jardine Bruce (2010–2021)
 Mary Douglas Glasspool (2010–2016)

Notable parishes 

 St. Mark's Episcopal Church, Glendale
 All Saints Episcopal Church, Pasadena
 St. James' Episcopal Church, South Pasadena
 All Saints' Episcopal Church, Beverly Hills
 Cathedral Center of St. Paul, Los Angeles
 St. John's Cathedral, Los Angeles
 St. Luke's Episcopal Church, Long Beach
 St. Thomas the Apostle, Hollywood
 Church of the Epiphany, Lincoln Heights

Education 

Schools include St. James' Episcopal School, an elementary school which opened in 1968. It has 344 students on roll of varying economic, ethnic, racial and social backgrounds. Josh Groban is a notable former student.

References

External links 
 
 Parishes of the Diocese of Los Angeles
 Church (United States) website
 Anglican Communion website
 Cathedrals of California
 Journal of the Annual Convention, Diocese of Los Angeles

Los Angeles
Christianity in Los Angeles
Diocese of Los Angeles
Religious organizations established in 1895
Anglican dioceses established in the 19th century
1895 establishments in California
Province 8 of the Episcopal Church (United States)